Grevillea oligantha is a species of flowering plant in the family Proteaceae and is endemic to southern Western Australia. It is dense shrub with many erect branches, egg-shaped, lance-shaped or linear leaves, and groups of up to six brownish-yellow, orange or reddish-brown flowers with a pale yellow to reddish style.

Description
The edges of the leaves are curved downwards and the lower surface is silky-hairy.

Taxonomy
Grevillea oligntha was first formally described in 1868 by Ferdinand von Mueller in Fragmenta Phytographiae Australiae from specimens collected by George Maxwell near the Phillips River. The specific epithet (oligantha) means "few-flowered".

Distribution and habitat
Grevillea oligantha grows in heath, tall shrubland and mallee woodland between Balladonia, Cape Arid, Bremer Bay and parts of the Stirling Range National Park in the Coolgardie, Esperance Plains and Mallee bioregions of southern Western Australia.

Conservation status
This grevillea is listed as "not threatened", by the Western Australian Government Department of Biodiversity, Conservation and Attractions.

See also
 List of Grevillea species

References

oligantha
Endemic flora of Western Australia
Eudicots of Western Australia
Proteales of Australia
Taxa named by Ferdinand von Mueller
Plants described in 1868